The 2022 Arachas Super 20 Trophy was the Twenty20 section of the eighth Women's Super Series competition, that took place in Ireland. The tournament took place in June and July 2022, alongside the 50 over Arachas Super 50 Cup. Three teams competed in a double round-robin group stage: Dragons, Scorchers and Typhoons. The tournament was won by Scorchers.

Competition format
The three sides played each other side twice in Twenty20 matches in June and July, including three matchdays involving double-headers. The tournament worked on a league system.

The league worked on a points system with positions being based on the total points. Points were awarded as follows:

Win: 2 points. 
Tie: 1 point. 
Loss: 0 points.
Abandoned/No Result: 1 point.

Squads

Source: Cricket Ireland

Points table

Source: CricketArchive

The tournament rules state that tie-breakers for sides level on points shall be applied in the following order - most wins, teams achieving most wins in matches between other teams level on points (head-to-head), then highest Net Run Rate across the whole competition. Scorchers and Dragons finished on the same number of points and wins, and each won one match against the other. Dragons finished with a superior Net Run Rate; however, the title was awarded to Scorchers.

Fixtures
Source: Cricket Ireland

References

Women's Super Series
2022 in Irish cricket